Rusippisir was a Phoenician, Carthaginian, and Roman town on Algeria's Mediterranean coast at the site of present-day Taksebt.

Name

Rusippisir is the latinization of the town's Punic name, which probably meant "Cape Rosemary".

Geography 
Rusippisir was located at Cape Tedless, Algeria, the site of present-day Taksebt in Tizi Ouzou.

History  
Rusippisir was established as a colony on the trade route between Phoenicia and the Strait of Gibraltar. Its port was nearby Iomnium (present-day Tigzirt). It later fell under Carthaginian and then, after the Punic Wars, Roman hegemony. Punic steles in Rusippisir continued to be produced well into the imperial period and there was tophet in the town.

Religion
In antiquity, Rusippisir was the site of a Christian bishopric. This was revived in the 20th century as a Catholic titular see.

List of bishops

 Léon-Théobald Delaere, OFM Cap (1967.08.03 – 1976.09.14)
 Theodore Edgar McCarrick (1977.05.24 – 1981.11.19) 
 Ivan Dias (1982.05.08 – 1996.11.08)
 Daniel Caro Borda (2000.07.21 – 2003.08.06)
 Martin David Holley (2004.05.18 – 2016.10.19)
 Mark E. Brennan (2017.01.19 - present)

References

Citations

Bibliography
 .

Catholic titular sees in Africa
Phoenician colonies in Algeria